Tim Luscombe (born 1960) is a British playwright, director, actor and teacher.

Training
After graduating with an MA (Geography) from Oxford University, Luscombe trained as a director at the Bristol Old Vic Theatre School in the mid 1980s.

Director
As a director, Luscombe has worked in London’s West End, On and Off-Broadway, in Sweden, the Netherlands, Japan and all over the UK. His most notable West End productions include Tom Stoppard’s Artist Descending a Staircase (at the Duke of Yorks, and subsequently at the Helen Hayes Theatre in New York), and Private Lives with Joan Collins at the Aldwych Theatre. His London fringe credits include a 1993 production of Joe Pintauro’s Snow Orchid featuring Jude Law at the Gate Theatre.

Playwright
As a playwright, Luscombe has written for the National Theatre Studio in London, the Royal Court Theatre (The One You Love) and Hampstead Theatre (The Schuman Plan). All three of his Jane Austen adaptations (Northanger Abbey, Persuasion and Mansfield Park) have been produced in the UK, Northanger Abbey being revived in Chicago in 2013. His play Pig was produced at Buddies in Bad Times Theatre in Toronto in 2013 where it was nominated for a Dora Mavor Moore Award for Outstanding New Play of 2014. Hungry Ghosts was produced at the Orange Tree Theatre in 2011, and EuroVision at the Drill Hall in 1994, subsequently transferring to the Vaudeville Theatre where it was produced by Sir Andrew Lloyd Webber.

Awards
He was nominated for a Laurence Olivier award for his productions of Noël Coward’s Easy Virtue and Terrence Rattigan’s The Browning Version & Harlequinade (1988). His play A Map of the Region was shortlisted for the Bruntwood Prize in 2011.

Bibliography

Drama (stage)
The Schuman Plan. (Nick Hern Books, 2006) 
Amateur Rites. (Silvermoon, 2014)

Stage adaptations
Northanger Abbey. (Nick Hern Books, 2005) 
Persuasion. (Oberon, 2011) 
Mansfield Park. (Oberon, 2012)

References

External links
 Official Website.
 Doollee (International playwrights' directory).

British directors
20th-century British male actors
1960 births
Living people
21st-century British male actors
British male stage actors
Alumni of the University of Oxford